is a Japanese professional beach volleyball player and politician. He was born in Kumamoto, Kumamoto Prefecture, Kyushu, Japan.

Asahi played as a center for the Japan men's national volleyball team in the 1990s. He ended up in sixteenth place at the 1998 World Championship, and later on started a career in beach volleyball. Asahi and teammate Katsuhiro Shiratori represented Japan in beach volleyball at the 2008 and 2012 Summer Olympics.

Asahi began to work for yhr IT company Forval Corporation in 2011 through a Japanese Olympic Committee athlete hiring program.

In July 2016, Asahi was elected as a member of the House of Councillors representing the Tokyo at-large district for the Liberal Democratic Party.

Honours

 1998 World Championship — 16th place

References

 Kentaro Asahi - Profile at the All Japan Team

External links

 
 
 

1975 births
Living people
Japanese men's volleyball players
Japanese beach volleyball players
Olympic beach volleyball players of Japan
Asian Games medalists in beach volleyball
Asian Games bronze medalists for Japan
Beach volleyball players at the 2006 Asian Games
Beach volleyball players at the 2008 Summer Olympics
Beach volleyball players at the 2010 Asian Games
Beach volleyball players at the 2012 Summer Olympics
Members of the House of Councillors (Japan)
Liberal Democratic Party (Japan) politicians
People from Kumamoto
Medalists at the 2010 Asian Games
Japanese sportsperson-politicians